The 1932 United States presidential election in Maine took place on November 8, 1932, as part of the 1932 United States presidential election which was held throughout all contemporary 48 states. Voters chose five representatives, or electors to the Electoral College, who voted for president and vice president. 

Maine voted for the Republican nominee, incumbent President Herbert Hoover of California, over the Democratic nominee, Governor Franklin D. Roosevelt of New York. Hoover's running mate was incumbent Vice President Charles Curtis of Kansas, while Roosevelt ran with incumbent Speaker of the House John Nance Garner of Texas.

Hoover won Maine by a margin of 12.64%, and with 55.83% of the popular vote, it would be his second strongest state in the nation after nearby Vermont. The state was also one of only six states, four of them in New England, which voted to re-elect the embattled Republican incumbent Hoover, who was widely unpopular over his failure to adequately address the Great Depression. Maine would also be one of the only two states in the nation (the other being nearby Vermont) to not vote for Roosevelt in any of his four election campaigns.

Results

Results by county

See also
 United States presidential elections in Maine

References

Maine
1932
1932 Maine elections